Emergency planning in Wales is carried out in line with the Civil Contingencies Act 2004 however as a result of devolution it is managed with its own ‘welsh flavour.’ For instance there are unique bodies operating in Wales like The Joint Emergency Services Group (JESG) and there is involvement from The Welsh Government.

Wales Resilience Forum
The Wales Resilience Forum is the highest level of emergency planning in Wales. It meets three times a year and is chaired by the First Minister.

Regional Local Resilience Forums

There are four Local Resilience Forums (LRF) in Wales, based on the areas of the four Welsh Police Areas:
Dyfed Powys Local Resilience Forum (Dyfed Powys LRF or DPLRF)
Gwent Local Resilience Forum (Gwent LRF or GLRF)
North Wales Local Resilience Forum (North Wales LRF or NWLRF)
South Wales Local Resilience Forum (South Wales LRF or SWLRF)
Each LRF includes the regional emergency services, the principal councils, and local health boards, a number of other government agencies that have responsibilities in the region, such as Public Health Wales and the Health and Safety Executive, and also transport agencies, utility companies, and the military.

The LRFs were established in 2004, as a requirement of the Civil Contingencies Act 2004, and effectively replaced the regional organisations such as the Gwent Emergency Planning and Liaison Group and the South Wales Emergency Services Liaison Committee that had been operating since 1994.

Responsibilities

The Local Resilience Forums are responsible for assessing risks, planning responses, and recovery from a range of incidents that could have a major impact on their areas. Incidents are classified as hazards or threats. Hazards are non-malicious events and typically include:
Transport accidents
Severe weather
Flooding
Industrial accidents and environmental pollution
Human health risks
Animal health risks
Industrial technical failure
Threats are planned events, such as a terrorist attack, and typically include:
Attacks using explosives
Chemical, biological, radiological or nuclear threats
Electronic attacks affecting utilities and communications

Legislation

The Local Regional Forums have specific duties defined by the following legislation:
Civil Contingencies Act 2004
The Control of Major Accident Hazard Regulations 1999
The Pipeline Safety Regulations 1996
Radiation (Emergency Preparedness & Public Information) Regulations 2001

Summary and areas of the four Local Resilience Forums

In addition, a number of other government agencies are also partners of the four Welsh local resilience forums including:
British Transport Police
Maritime and Coastguard Agency
Public Health Wales
Natural Resources Wales
The Met Office
Health and Safety Executive
and also utility companies, transport agencies, and the military.

References

Emergency management in the United Kingdom